Year 1438 (MCDXXXVIII) was a common year starting on Wednesday (link will display the full calendar) of the Julian calendar.

Events 
 January–December 
 January 1 – Albert II of Habsburg becomes King of Hungary.
 January 9 – The city of Cluj (Kolozsvár) is conquered, thus marking the end of the Transylvanian peasant revolt, which started at Bobâlna.
 January 10 – The Council of Florence opens in Ferrara.
 February 2 – The Unio Trium Nationum pact is established in Transylvania.
 February 10 – All Souls' College is founded in the University of Oxford by Henry Chichele, Archbishop of Canterbury, and Henry VI of England as a graduate institution.
 March 18 – Albert II of Habsburg becomes King of Germany.
 July 7 – Charles VII of France issues the Pragmatic Sanction of Bourges, giving the French church control over the appointment of bishops, and depriving the Pope of French ecclesiastical revenues.
 September 13 – Afonso V becomes King of Portugal.
 October
 Eric of Pomerania, King of Sweden, Denmark and Norway, loses direct control of Sweden, as Karl Knutsson Bonde is elected Regent of Sweden.
 The siege of Brescia in Italy by the condottieri troops of Niccolò Piccinino, begun on July 11, is raised after the arrival of Scaramuccia da Forlì.

 Date unknown 
 Pachacuti becomes ruler of the Kingdom of Cusco and begins its expansion into the Inca Empire (Tahuantinsuyu).
 At 95 years of age, Nang Keo Phimpha becomes queen of Lan Xang for a few months before being deposed and killed.
 Just two years after the Ming dynasty court of China allowed landowners paying the grain tax to pay their tax in silver instead, the Ming court now decides to close all silver mines and prohibit all private silver mining in Zhejiang and Fujian provinces. This is a concerted effort to halt the increase of silver circulating into the market. The illegal mining of silver is now an offense punishable by death; although it becomes a dangerous affair, the high demand for silver also makes it very lucrative, and so many chose to defy the government and continue to mine.
 The Sukhothai Kingdom merges with the Ayutthaya Kingdom.

Births 
 February 5
 Margaret of Bourbon, French noble (d. 1483)
 Philip II, Duke of Savoy (d. 1497)
 February 12 – Adolf, Duke of Guelders and Count of Zutphen (1465–1471) (d. 1477)
 March 23 – Ludovico II, Marquess of Saluzzo, Italian noble (d. 1504)
 April 3 – John III of Egmont, Dutch noble (d. 1516)
 September 7 – Louis II, Landgrave of Lower Hesse (1458–1471) (d. 1471)
 December 1 – Peter II, Duke of Bourbon, son of Charles I (d. 1503)
 date unknown – Husayn Bayqarah, Timurid ruler of Herat (d. 1506)
 probable – Edmund Beaufort, 4th Duke of Somerset, English nobleman and military commander during the Wars of the Roses (d. 1471)

Deaths 
 April 24 – Humphrey FitzAlan, 15th Earl of Arundel (b. 1429)
 September 9 – Edward, King of Portugal (b. 1391)
 October 16 – Anne of Gloucester, English noblewoman (b. 1383)
 October 20 – Jacopo della Quercia, Sienese sculptor (b. c. 1374)

References